Ray Wert is the former head of Gawker's content sales department of Gawker Media, and used to be the editor in chief of the Gawker-owned automotive weblog Jalopnik.  He has been a senior staffer for Michigan Governor Jennifer Granholm, and a campaign organizer on staff for Presidential candidate John Kerry. Wert has written for The New York Times, Popular Mechanics and Cat Fancy, and is a regular contributor to various CNBC shows such as On the Money.  Wert splits his time between New York City and metro Detroit. His wife, Mallory McMorrow, was elected in 2018 as Michigan state Senator in the 13th District.

Wert provided some on screen commentary for the 2011 film Revenge of the Electric Car.

References

American online publication editors
Living people
Year of birth missing (living people)
American Jews
Michigan State University alumni